The 1934 Rutgers Queensmen football team represented Rutgers University in the 1934 college football season. In their fourth season under head coach J. Wilder Tasker, the Queensmen compiled a 5–3–1 record, won the Middle Three Conference championship, and outscored their opponents 184 to 68.

Schedule

References

Rutgers
Rutgers Scarlet Knights football seasons
Rutgers Queensmen football